Anna Helene Koch ( Boyksen; 11 August 1881 – 1920) was the first female engineering student at the Technical University of Munich.

Life 
Anna Boyksen was born on 11 August 1881 in Havendorfersand, Grand Duchy of Oldenburg, to Dietrich Anton Boyksen, a merchant, and his wife Mathilde, née Lubben. In her curriculum vitae, Boyksen claimed her nationality as Bavarian and religion as evangelical.

In 1906, she enrolled in the Institute of Electrical Engineering of the Technical University of Munich and obtained the Vordiplom two years later. She then studied economics and law at the University of Erlangen. In 1911, she defended her dissertation, titled Die deutschen Börsenordnungen. Eine vergleichende Darstellung (The German Stock Exchange Regulations. A Comparative Representation), under her married name Anna Helene Koch.

Legacy 
The Anna Boyksen Diversity Research Center at TUM "explores human diversity and the opportunities of diversity for society. Its work focuses on a question often overlooked in Germany: How can the natural, engineering and life sciences benefit from a more diverse community culture?"

The Anna Boyksen Fellowship has been offered by the TUM Institute for Advanced Study since 2014. The Fellowship is granted to outstanding international scholars and researchers who wish to probe gender / diversity-related problems in the Natural and Engineering Sciences, in collaboration with TUM researchers.  The two-year Fellowship was created to help advance TUM's goal to become "Germany's most attractive university for women" and to foster a productive and durable exchange of ideas and solutions on an international level.

References

1881 births
1920 deaths
Year of death missing
German women engineers
Technical University of Munich alumni
University of Erlangen-Nuremberg alumni
Engineers from Bavaria